Coronel Geraldo Guias de Aquino Airport  is the airport serving Campo Mourão, Brazil. 

It is operated by the Municipality of Acampo Mourão under the supervision of Aeroportos do Paraná (SEIL).

Airlines and destinations

Access

See also

List of airports in Brazil

References

External links

Airports in Paraná (state)